Mount Telomoyo is a stratovolcano in Central Java, Indonesia. The Soropati volcano collapsed during the Pleistocene, leaving a U-shaped depression.

See also 

 List of volcanoes in Indonesia

References 

Stratovolcanoes of Indonesia
Mountains of Central Java
Volcanoes of Central Java